Okino (written: 沖野) is a Japanese surname. Notable people with the surname include:

, Japanese footballer and manager
, Japanese footballer

Fictional characters
, a character in the manga series Case Closed

Other people
Betty Okino (born 1975), American actress and gymnast

See also
Okino coal mine, a coal mine in Buryatia, Russia

Japanese-language surnames